Bozhidar Milenkov (Bulgarian: Божидар Миленков) (born 1 December 1954) is a Bulgarian sprint canoer who competed from the late 1970s to the early 1980s. Competing in two Summer Olympics, he won a bronze medal in the K-4 1000 m event at Moscow in 1980.

References
 Sport-reference.com profile

1954 births
Bulgarian male canoeists
Canoeists at the 1976 Summer Olympics
Canoeists at the 1980 Summer Olympics
Living people
Olympic canoeists of Bulgaria
Olympic bronze medalists for Bulgaria
Olympic medalists in canoeing

Medalists at the 1980 Summer Olympics